Nabou is a 1968 science fiction novel by German author Günther Krupkat. Written as a sequel to his 1963 novel Als die Götter starben, Nabou narrates an expedition into the interior of the Earth. A member of a research team investigating Earth's crust is revealed to be a biorobot, or "Biomat," left by an advanced spacefaring people called the Mejuans. The encounter between the humans and the alien representative is a comparative class encounter between advanced socialist aliens and human societies in a "lower stage" of development without open class conflict.  A 1989 survey ranks it as the 13th most popular East German science fiction novel.

References

Bibliography
 Fritzsche, Sonja. Science Fiction Literature in East Germany. Oxford; New York: Lang, 2006. 
 Neumann, Hans-Peter. Die grosse illustrierte Bibliographie der Science Fiction in der DDR. Berlin: Shayol, 2002.
 Steinmüller, Angela and Karlheinz. Vorgriff auf das Lichte Morgen. Passau: Erster Deutscher Fantasy Club, 1995.

External links

1968 science fiction novels
German science fiction novels
East German novels
Novels about extraterrestrial life
Biorobotics in fiction
1968 German novels